Mayank is a masculine given name found in India. This word means shining moon.

Notable people
Mayank Agarwal (born 1991), Indian cricketer
Mayank Anand, Indian actor
Mayank Austen Soofi, Indian writer
Mayank Chhaya, journalist 
Mayank Dagar (born 1996), Indian cricketer 
Mayank Gandhi (born 1958), Indian social activist 
Mayank Markande (born 1997), Indian cricketer
Mayank Mishra (born 1990), Indian cricketer
Mayank Prakash (born 1973) 
Mayank Raghav (born 1988), Indian cricketer
Mayank Shekhar, Indian film critic
Mayank Sidhana (born 1986), Indian cricketer
Mayank Tehlan (born 1986), Indian cricketer

References

Masculine given names